Figure 8 roller coasters are a category of roller coasters where the train runs through a figure 8 shaped course before returning to the boarding station.  This design was one of the first designs to be featured in roller coaster design, along with the out and back roller coaster.  The figure 8 design allowed for more turns than the out and back design, offering riders an alternative experience.

An early and famous example of a Figure 8 is the Leap the Dips at Lakemont Park, in Altoona, Pennsylvania.

Many figure 8 roller coasters carry the name "Figure 8."

Figure 8 roller coasters  
An Incomplete List of Figure 8 roller coasters

Flying Fish, Thorpe Park (UK)
Runaway Train, Chessington World of Adventures (UK)

 
Types of roller coaster